Chimerogyrus gigagalea is a fossil species of beetle in the family Gyrinidae, the only known species in the genus Chimerogyrus. It is known from a larval form found in Cenomanian aged Burmese amber of Myanmar. it was found to be a member of Gyrininae, sister to Dineutini + Orectochilini.

References

†
Fossil taxa described in 2020
Burmese amber
Prehistoric beetle genera
†
Cretaceous insects